Mariano Guerreiro (born 20 January 1993) is an Argentine footballer who plays as a centre forward for UAI Urquiza.

References

External links

Living people
1993 births
Argentine footballers
Argentine expatriate footballers
Primera Nacional players
Bolivian Primera División players
Argentinos Juniors footballers
Club Atlético Brown footballers
Club Blooming players
Defensa y Justicia footballers
Guillermo Brown footballers
Instituto footballers
Expatriate footballers in Bolivia
Association football forwards